Efe Obada (born April 13, 1992) is a Nigerian-British gridiron football defensive end for the Washington Commanders of the National Football League (NFL). He was raised in the Netherlands and England and was the first player to go straight from a European football league to the NFL. Obada has been a member of the London Warriors, Dallas Cowboys, Kansas City Chiefs, Atlanta Falcons, Carolina Panthers, and Buffalo Bills.

Early years
Born in Nigeria, Obada and his family later moved to the Netherlands. At the age of 10, he and his sister were trafficked into England and were left homeless as soon as they arrived in London. They initially slept in an office block before living in 10 different foster homes. He eventually began work as a security guard at Grace Foods in Welwyn Garden City.

Professional career

London Warriors
Obada signed with the London Warriors of the BAFA National Leagues in 2014, where he played in five games as a tight end and defensive end.

Dallas Cowboys
Based on a recommendation from Warriors defensive coordinator Aden Durde, who previously served as an intern coach with the Dallas Cowboys, Obada was given the opportunity to work out for the team days before the Cowboys' game against the Jacksonville Jaguars in London. Although he did not have much experience, he was signed on April 1, 2015. In rookie mini-camp, he was tried on the first days at tight end, before the team decided to move him to defensive end, where the learning curve would not be as steep. He was waived on September 5. On September 23, 2015, he was signed to the Cowboys' practice squad. He was released on October 7, but rejoined the practice squad on December 2. He was waived on March 2, 2016.

Kansas City Chiefs
Obada was signed by the Kansas City Chiefs on March 9, 2016. He was released by the team on June 7.

Atlanta Falcons
On July 28, 2016, he was signed by the Atlanta Falcons. He was waived on August 27.

Carolina Panthers

On May 25, 2017, Obada was signed by the Carolina Panthers through the NFL's International Player Pathway Program. He was waived by the Panthers on September 1, 2017, and was re-signed to the practice squad. He signed a reserve/future contract with the Panthers on January 8, 2018. After a strong preseason, Obada became the first player from the NFL International Player Pathway program to make a 53-man roster. In Week 3, against the Cincinnati Bengals, Obada played his first regular season game, where he had one sack and one interception. He was later awarded the game ball, and was named the NFC Defensive Player of the Week. He finished the season with eight combined tackles and two sacks.

On January 23, 2019, Obada signed a one-year contract extension with the Panthers. On October 13, 2019, Obada was made an honorary captain for the Panthers' NFL London Game vs. the Tampa Bay Buccaneers at Tottenham Hotspur Stadium as part of a very emotional day for him. On January 6, 2020, Obada signed a one-year contract extension with the Panthers. He was waived on September 6, 2020, but re-signed with the team the next day. In Week 3 of the 2020 season against the Los Angeles Chargers, Obada recovered a fumble lost by wide receiver Keenan Allen on the last play of the game to secure a 21–16 win for the Panthers.

Buffalo Bills
On April 19, 2021, Obada signed a one-year deal with the Buffalo Bills. He recorded 3.5 sacks with 12 tackles in 10 games.

Washington Commanders
Obada signed a one-year deal with the Washington Commanders on March 23, 2022.

NFL career statistics

References

External links
 
 Washington Commanders bio

Living people
1992 births
English players of American football
Sportspeople from London
American football defensive ends
Nigerian players of American football
Dallas Cowboys players
Kansas City Chiefs players
Atlanta Falcons players
Carolina Panthers players
Buffalo Bills players
Washington Commanders players
International Player Pathway Program participants
Expatriate players of American football
English expatriate sportspeople in the United States